is an animated television series based on an Argentine comic strip series of the same name created by Argentine authors Carlos Trillo (story) and Carlos Meglia (art). The series was produced by the Vancouver-based Network of Animation (NoA) and animated in Japan by TMS Entertainment. Many of the comic's darker themes had to be toned down for the show in order to make it appropriate for all audiences. The series originally aired on Teletoon in Canada, Fox Kids in the United States, Kids Station in Japan and Telefe in Argentina.

The show is about a leather-clad female gynoid who works as a male teacher during the day, and fights against the scientist who created her at night.

The music for the series was composed by Robbi Finkel. Its opening and ending songs were composed by Finkel with lyrics by Robert Olivier and sung by jazz vocalist Coral Egan. On May 6, 2000 Cybersix won "Best Animated Production" and "Best Overall Sound of an Animated Production" at the Leo Awards. On April 28, 2001, the series won "Special Mention for the Best Science Fiction Program" at the Pulcinella Awards in Italy for that year's competition.

Cast 
 Cathy Weseluck as Cybersix / Adrian Seidelman 
 Michael Dobson as Lucas Amato & Fixed Ideas
 Scott McNeil as Data-7
 Terry Klassen as Dr. Von Reichter
 Andrew Francis as Julian
 Alex Doduk as José
 Janyse Jaud as Lori Anderson, Elaine (in Full Moon Fascination) & Grizelda (in Daylight Devil)
 Brian Drummond as Yashimoto
 L. Harvey Gold as Terra

Production
Each episode had a production budget of US$360,000. The series was cancelled after the first season due to low ratings outside of Canada and conflicts with the studio, most notably TMS Entertainment focusing on its own productions rather than outsourcing animation to other studios, because by the early 2000s, TMS no longer supplied animation services to western studios due to increasingly demanding costs.

Episodes

Home video release
The series was released in English on DVD in North America by Discotek Media on 26 August 2014. The box set features commentary by Cathy Weseluck and Brady Hartel on episodes 1 and 13, liner notes on episodes 4 and 11, textless opening and ending animations, and the television pilot.

References

External links
 
 
 Telecom's official Cybersix page (English)
 of. Japan cite

1999 Canadian television series debuts
1999 Canadian television series endings
1999 Japanese television series debuts
1999 Japanese television series endings
1990s Canadian animated television series
1990s Canadian science fiction television series
1990s Japanese television series
Anime-influenced Western animated television series
Canadian children's animated action television series
Canadian children's animated science fantasy television series
Canadian children's animated superhero television series
Japanese children's animated action television series
Japanese children's animated science fantasy television series
Japanese children's animated superhero television series
Discotek Media
Fox Broadcasting Company original programming
Fox Kids
Teletoon original programming
Television shows based on comics
TMS Entertainment
Vampires in animated television
Vampires in television